Salix phlebophylla, the skeletonleaf willow or skeleton-leaf willow,  is a species of flowering plant in the family Salicaceae, with an amphi-Beringian distribution. A prostrate shrub reaching at most , its tiny leaves persist on the plant until only the withered brown veins remain.

References

phlebophylla
Flora of the Russian Far East
Flora of the Aleutian Islands
Flora of Alaska
Flora of Yukon
Flora of the Northwest Territories
Plants described in 1858